Ann Cochrane Cook Wallace Budge (born 21 February 1948) is a Scottish businesswoman and company director.

Career
Budge graduated with a psychology degree, and became the first woman appointed to a senior position in Scottish & Newcastle after starting her career there as a trainee programmer. After leaving F International - now Xansa - Budge set up business working from home, and teaming up with Allison Newell in 1985, launched Newell & Budge, which specialised in making bespoke software and IT systems. It was sold to the French IT company Sopra Group, for a reported £30 million, and Budge became a chief executive.

Recognition
Budge was awarded "Entrepreneur of the Year" by the Entrepreneurial Exchange in 2005 and was then inducted into the Entrepreneurial Exchange Hall of Fame in November 2013. She is listed as a role model by the Women's Engineering Society.

She is an Honorary Graduate of Heriot-Watt University and Edinburgh Napier University.

Football 
Budge was disclosed as being the sole director of BIDCO 1874, a consortium trying to buy Edinburgh-based football club Hearts out of administration, in early 2014. A majority shareholding in the club, which was previously owned by Lithuanian businesses run by Vladimir Romanov, was sold to BIDCO 1874 in May 2014. Budge made several changes at the club immediately after taking control, including the appointment of Craig Levein as director of football and Robbie Neilson as head coach.

In 2016, Budge was awarded the SPFL CEO of the Year award.

References

1948 births
Living people
British women business executives
Place of birth missing (living people)
Chairmen and investors of football clubs in Scotland
Heart of Midlothian F.C. directors and chairmen